Montallegro (Sicilian: Muntallegru) is a comune (municipality) in the Province of Agrigento in the Italian region Sicily, located about  south of Palermo and about  northwest of Agrigento.

Montallegro borders the following municipalities: Agrigento, Cattolica Eraclea, Siculiana.

References

Cities and towns in Sicily